Eppelstun is a surname. Notable people with the surname include:

Greg Eppelstun (born 1966), Australian rules footballer
Michael Eppelstun, Australian bodyboarder